Odd Nansen (6 December 1901 – 27 June 1973) was a Norwegian architect, writer, and humanitarian. He is credited with being a co-founder of UNICEF  and for his humanitarian efforts on behalf of Jews in the early years of World War II.

Biography
Odd Nansen was born in Bærum, Akershus, Norway. He was the second youngest of five children born to scientist and explorer Fridtjof Nansen. He was raised at Lysaker outside of Oslo. After his mother, Eva Nansen, died in 1907, he was raised in the home of his neighbor, Anton Klaveness. In 1920 he began studying architecture at the Norwegian Institute of Technology in Trondheim. From 1927-30, he worked  in New York City. During 1930, he returned to Oslo and apprenticed with Arnstein Arneberg.

In 1931 Nansen started his own architectural practice in Oslo. He also formed the humanitarian organization Nansenhjelpen in 1936 to provide relief for Jews fleeing Nazi persecution in central Europe. The Jewish Children's Home in Oslo   (jødiske barnehjemmet i Oslo) was established during 1939 under the auspices of Nansenhjelpen.

Nansen focused his efforts on the situation in Czechoslovakia. Together with his wife Kari Nansen and journalist Tove Filseth, wife of  publisher Max Tau, he established a field office in Prague and traveled extensively in Europe in 1939 to get attention and help for refugees facing imminent destruction.

After returning to Norway, he joined the nascent Norwegian resistance and was himself arrested and detained by the Gestapo, and ultimately deported to the concentration camp at Sachsenhausen. He was also a forced laborer at the Veidal Prison Camp. Nansen maintained a diary during his imprisonment that he hid and preserved. These diaries were published after the war and provide an in-depth, first hand account of life and death in Nazi concentration camps.

He survived captivity in the camps and returned to Norway where he resumed his architectural career, while also initiating several humanitarian efforts. He was the president of One World from 1947 to 1956 and is considered a co-founder of UNICEF. For his humanitarian efforts, Odd Nansen received many Norwegian and international decorations and honors. He was appointed commander of the Order of St. Olav in 1970. He was decorated with the Grand Cross of the Order of Merit of the Federal Republic of Germany, and received the Decoration of Honour for Services to the Republic of Austria.

Among Nansen's architectural works are the main terminal building at the (now decommissioned) Fornebu Airport from 1963. He also led restoration work for his childhood home at Polhøgda. 

Nansen was married to Karen "Kari" Hirsch (1903–1985). They were the parents of architect and humanitarian, Eigil Nansen and jurist Marit Greve, wife of diplomat Tim Greve.

References

Bibliography
 
  the English translation of Fra dag til dag
  
  - book about Thomas Buergenthal

Related reading
Odd Nansen, Timothy J. Boyce. editor  (2016) From Day to Day: One Man's Diary of Survival in Nazi Concentration Camps   (Vanderbilt University Press)

External links
 

1901 births
1973 deaths
People from Bærum
Norwegian Institute of Technology alumni
Norwegian diarists
20th-century Norwegian writers
20th-century Norwegian architects
Norwegian resistance members
Norwegian World War II memoirists
Sachsenhausen concentration camp survivors
The Holocaust in Norway
UNICEF people
Grand Crosses with Star and Sash of the Order of Merit of the Federal Republic of Germany
Recipients of the Decoration for Services to the Republic of Austria
Norwegian officials of the United Nations
20th-century diarists